Nanoor Assembly constituency is an assembly constituency in Birbhum district in the Indian state of West Bengal. It is reserved for scheduled castes.

Overview
As per orders of the Delimitation Commission, No. 287, Nanoor Assembly constituency (SC) is composed of the following: Nanoor CD Block, and Bahiri Panchshowa, Kankalitala, Kasba, Sarpalehana Albandha, Sian Muluk and Singhee gram panchayats of Bolpur Sriniketan CD Block.

Nanoor Assembly constituency is part of No. 41 Bolpur (Lok Sabha constituency) (SC).

Election results

2021
In the 2016 elections, Bidhan Chandra Majhi of Trinamool Congress defeated his nearest rival, Tarakeswar Saha of BJP.

2016
In the 2016 elections, Shyamali Pradhan of CPI(M) defeated her nearest rival Gadhadar Hazra of Trinamool Congress.

2011
In the 2011 elections, Gadhadar Hazra of Trinamool Congress defeated his nearest rival Shyamali Pradhan of CPI(M).

 

.# Swing calculated on Congress+Trinamool Congress vote percentages taken together in 2006.

1977–2006
In the 2006 state assembly elections, Joydeb Hazra of CPI(M) won the Nanoor (SC) seat defeating his nearest rival Gadadhar Hazra of Trinamool Congress. Contests in most years were multi cornered but only winners and runners are being mentioned. Ananda Gopal Das of CPI(M) defeated Krishnagopal Majhi of Trinamool Congress in 2001, Sibkinkar Saha of Congress in 1996 and 1991, and Adhir Kumar Saha of Congress in 1987. Banamali Das of CPI(M) defeated Sibkinkar Saha of Congress in 1982 and Dulal Saha of Congress in 1977.

1951–1972
Dulal Saha of Congress won in 1972. Banamali Das of CPI(M) won in 1971 and 1969. S.Jash of Congress won in 1967. The Nannor constituency was not there in 1962 and 1957. It was a joint seat in 1951. It was won by Sisir Kumar Saha and Basanta Lal Murarka, both of Congress.

References

Assembly constituencies of West Bengal
Politics of Birbhum district